The IOWN Global Forum is a non-profit trade association designing an all-photonics network architecture that would be expected to deliver higher resiliency and much faster performances both that should enable new services and applications.

History
Formed in 2020 by founding members NTT, Intel and Sony, the Forum focuses on two key technologies to improve communication infrastructure. First, it focuses on photonics networks. An All-Photonics Network (APN) is an end-to-end optical communication system that is expected to handle future needs by delivering excellent bandwidth, low latency, flexibility and energy efficiency. Second, it focuses on digital twin computing, which extends the concept of a conventional digital twin for humans to things or aims to enable them to be recreated and autonomously behave and interact without restrictions.

Introduction

The IOWN Global Forum focuses on collaboration within its multiple committees and working groups to create Proof of Reference (PoC) documents as well as white papers, use cases, and fact sheets on the advancement of communication infrastructure. The Forum has a goal of achieving lower power consumption, higher transmission capacity, lower latency, and more in its technology by 2030 which it calls its Vision 2030 goal.

Standards and Resources
The IOWN Global Forum publishes official documents on multiple network and communication infrastructure topics such as open all-photonic networks, data-centric infrastructure, and fiber sensing.

Reference Documents
The IOWN Global Forum has published multiple reference documents on various topics, including seven PoC Reference documents. The documents explain the importance of and the science behind the different technologies the Forum is investigating.

Use Cases
The purpose of the IOWN Global Forum's use cases is to identify the requirements of various applications that could use the contemplated next-generation optical network that the Forum is investigating. Current use cases available for the public included topics such as AI integration and cyber-physical systems.

Fact Sheets and White Papers
The IOWN Global Forum has fact sheets and white papers for public viewing that discuss its vision and technical directions for the industry as well as technologies that are being investigated.

Structure

IOWN Global Forum members participate in multiple steering committees and working groups.

Committees

Technology Steering Committee
The Technology Steering Committee (TSC) oversees the Technical Working Group as well as assists the Board in working group management and operation. The TSC also coordinates cross-working group collaboration and workload planning for the other groups.

Vision Steering Committee
The Vision Steering Committee (VSC) oversees the Use Case Working Group and other related working groups, helping to coordinate workload planning and adherence to the IOWN Global Forum's Governing Documents. The VSC reports to the Board on the progress of its working groups.

Marketing Steering Committee
The Marketing Steering Committee (MSC) is responsible for the public relations activities and raises awareness of the IOWN Global Forum by planning and executing various marketing communication efforts, such as industry events and conference planning, pitch deck and press release creation, video production and member meeting planning.

Working Groups

Technology Working Group
The Technology Working Group (TWG) works to identify technical domains, scopes and content to focus on in the Forum. Once a particular technical domain has enough interest, the TWG works to create a specific working group for that technology, identifying its scope and expected deliverables.

Liaison Working Group
The Liaison Working Group (LWG) creates and maintains official liaison relationships with external organizations for the IOWN Global Forum to encourage outside collaboration. The Group also works on liaison strategy and assists other working groups in the production of liaison statements.

Use Case Working Group
The Use Case Working Group (UCWG) researched possible future use case scenarios made possible by the new technologies proposed by the Forum. These use cases will also influence the direction of research and development at the Forum.

Membership

Members of IOWN Global Forum are categorized into four different membership types. Any like-minded organization that is invested in furthering the world of IOWN is invited to apply.

Founding Members
The founding members are the organizations that created the Forum in 2019 were Intel,NTT and Sony.

Sponsor Members
Sponsor members of the IOWN Global Forum are organizations that are willing to commit time and resources to support the Forum. There is an annual fee and the benefits of being a sponsor member include eligibility for a Board seat, voting eligibility in the Board election, approval of final documents (if the Board is joined), eligibility to be a member committee chair/vice-chair/member or a working group chair, as well as all other benefits included in the general membership. As of 2023, sponsor members included Cisco, Dell Technologies, Samsung, Red Hat, and Toyota.

General Members
General members of the IOWN Global Forum are companies that are interested in the world of IOWN and want to be a part of its development. Benefits include eligibility to be a working group vice chair, the ability to propose new work items, the ability to participate and vote in working groups, attend member meetings, and access to all in-progress and published documents. As of 2023, general members include companies like Hewlett Packard Enterprise, Hitachi, Mitsubishi Corporation, NetApp, and Qualcomm.

Academic or Research Members
Academic or research members of the IOWN Global Forum are non-profit entities that are primarily educational or research organizations. Benefits include the ability to propose new work items, participate in and observe working groups, attend member meetings, and access all in-progress and published documents. Academic or research members include the Industrial Technology Research Institute, Osaka University, SBI Graduate School, and the University of Tokyo.

References

External links

Organizations established in 2021
2021 establishments in the United States